Naz Çağla Irmak (born 19 October 1997) is a Turkish actress best known for her role as Kader Kutay Lokumucuzade in the drama series Kırgın Çiçekler (2015–2018).

Biography 
Irmak is the daughter of actress Hülya Gülşen Irmak. She first appeared in front of the camera with her mother in the TV series Bizim Evin Halleri. She made her cinematic debut with Çakallarla Dans 5, which was released in 2019. Her most recent role on stage was in an adaptation of Fyodor Dostoevsky's play "Westend - End of the West".

Çağla Irmak is set to portray Neslican Tay, an activist who died due to cancer, in the movie Demir Kadın Neslican.

Filmography

Television

Film

Streaming platforms

References

External links 
 
 

1997 births
Actresses from Ankara
Living people
Turkish child actresses
Turkish television actresses
Turkish film actresses